Bill Einreinhofer is an American television producer, director, writer and educator. He has developed and produced programming for the PBS NewsHour, Good Morning America and HBO. A member of the Directors Guild of America, he was an executive producer at WNET in New York and for the PBS series Innovation. He produced, directed and wrote Spacewalkers: The Ultimate High-Wire Act for the Discovery Channel. His most recent Public TV documentary is Unsettled History: America, China and the Doolittle Tokyo Raid, which explores how a small group of American aviators changed the course of World War II, and the story of an equally courageous group of ordinary Chinese men and women who rescued them. It is distributed by American Public Television (APT) and was seen on 250+ Public TV stations nationwide, in 79 of the top 80 markets, including New York, Los Angeles, Chicago, Washington DC, Philadelphia, Houston and San Francisco. He was Executive Producer of the independent feature film Invisible Love, the story of a young, idealistic woman repeatedly betrayed by the men in her life. The film is set during the 1930s in what was then known as French Indochina. It was selected Best International Feature at the 2021 Paris International Film Festival. He is Chair Emeritus of the Broadcast Journalism department at the New York Film Academy. In addition to working on NYFA's Manhattan campus, he has also taught and co-taught media and journalism seminars across Asia. Many of his former students have gone on to successful careers in broadcast and digital journalism throughout the United States and around the world.

Career
He conceived and was executive producer of Innovation, the long-running PBS science, health and technology news series. This included supervising production of the Innovation mini-series People in Motion. Hosted by Itzhak Perlman and Marlee Matlin, People in Motion was praised for its focus on technology as a means of empowerment for people with disabilities. He has also developed and produced programming for the PBS NewsHour, Good Morning America and HBO. He produced, directed and wrote Spacewalkers: The Ultimate High-Wire Act for the Discovery Channel.

Over the course of his career, Einreinhofer has won numerous awards, including three Emmy Awards, a CINE Golden Eagle, a Golden Gate Award from the San Francisco International Film Festival  and a Silver Hugo at the Chicago International Film Festival.

While an executive producer at WNET in New York, Einreinhofer was responsible for the PBS non-fiction mini-series and specials The Future Is Now, The Stuff of Dreams and Earth Tech '92. An international co-production, Earth Tech ’92 was hosted by NPR correspondent Scott Simon from the 1992 United Nations Conference on Environment and Development (popularly known as the "Earth Summit") in Rio de Janeiro, Brazil.

He has produced an extensive body of work in and about China. The first program was the public television documentary China Now: To Get Rich Is Glorious, which explored what China's leaders dubbed "socialism with Chinese characteristics."  In The Hidden China, he chronicled the journey of a group of wealthy Americans visiting China in search of investment opportunities. Sichuan Stories documented the long-term work being done in rural western China by internationally known NGO Save The Children. So Very Far From Home was a 2005 American-Chinese co-production. It told the stories of five American children, each of whom was stranded in Japanese-occupied China during World War II. Sent to brutal prison camps, their experiences helped form the basis of Steven Spielberg’s epic film Empire of the Sun.

Probably his best-known international project is Beyond Beijing, a four-part documentary series which seen by television viewers in 43 countries , as well as a 120-minute educational and home video version now in the collections of 324 libraries worldwide. Tied to the 2008 Summer Olympics, the series explored the six Chinese cities in addition to Beijing that hosted Olympic events. In 2012, he was Executive Producer of Every Day Is A Holiday, a one-hour documentary that followed a young Chinese-American woman as she discovered her father’s hidden and heroic past. The program was broadcast nationally on more than 200 PBS television stations.

His most recent Public TV documentary is Unsettled History: America, China and the Doolittle Tokyo Raid, which explores how a small group of American aviators changed the course of World War II, and the story of an equally courageous group of ordinary Chinese men and women who rescued them. It is distributed by American Public Television (APT) and was seen on 250+ Public TV stations nationwide, in 79 of the top 80 markets, including New York, Los Angeles, Chicago, Washington DC, Philadelphia, Houston and San Francisco. In 2018, he completed the Public TV documentary Shanghai 1937: Where World War II Began, which examines a battle which some historians call “the first battle of World War II” given that it became the template for modern urban warfare. It was distributed by American Public Television (APT) and broadcast on 200+ Public TV stations nationwide. It was also sold to European and Asian broadcasters, including Germany's ZDF. He was Executive Producer of the independent feature film Invisible Love, the story of a young, idealistic woman repeatedly betrayed by the men in her life. A China/Vietnam/US co-production, the film is set during the 1930s in what was then known as French Indochina. The film was selected Best International Feature at the 2021 Paris International Film Festival.

Bill Einreinhofer is also responsible for numerous corporate video productions. Clients included well-known global corporations (INSIGHT WORLDWIDE), successful high-tech enterprises, (Humans vs. Microbes) nonprofits (Five Points of Life) and faith-based organizations (My Xavier). A prolific writer, his op-ed essays have appeared online and in numerous publications including The New York Times

He is Chair Emeritus of the Broadcast Journalism department at the New York Film Academy, having joined the faculty of the school in 2013. Many of his former students have gone on to successful careers in broadcast and digital journalism across the United States and around the world. In 2020 he conceived, and co-taught, a three-week Moscow Journalism Summer School, which attracted early career journalists from across Russia. Later in the year he co-taught a seminar on "Production 'Best Practices' in the Era of COVID-19" at Astana Media Week, an online gathering of 1,000+ media executives from throughout Central Asia. Both projects were supported by the U.S. State Department. Previously he was an adjunct professor in the Communications program at Felician College on their Rutherford, New Jersey campus. From 2012 through 2018 he was the producer/writer of an ongoing pro bono series of local oral history videos, Rutherford Historic Narratives, created for the Rutherford Civil Rights Commission.

References 

PBS people
Year of birth missing (living people)
Living people
American television producers
American television writers
American male television writers
American television directors
Emmy Award winners